Arctostaphylos morroensis is a species of manzanita known by the common name Morro manzanita. This shrub is endemic to San Luis Obispo County, California, where it is known only from the vicinity of Morro Bay.

Distribution
There are 18 occurrences of the Arctostaphylos morroensis plant, and it is abundant in some local areas. It is limited to a specific type of substrate known as "Baywood fine sands", a type of sandy soil which originated in the Pleistocene as windblown sand dunes. The plant is found on less than 900 acres of coastal sage scrub and chaparral habitat, sometimes forming monotypic stands on hillsides.

Two thirds of its habitat is privately owned, some of it is slated for development, and its habitat requirements are narrow; these and other problems led to the plant's being listed as a threatened species in 1994. Some of the plants are protected within Montaña de Oro State Park.

Description
Arctostaphylos morroensis is a spreading shrub, reaching up to 4 meters in height but generally staying wider than tall. It has shreddy red-gray bark and whiskery bristles on the smaller branches and twigs. The leaves are oval-shaped and slightly convex, dark green on the upper surface and duller gray-green beneath. Plentiful flowers hang in dense clusters on short pedicels during the winter months. They are usually very light pink, urn-shaped, and hairy inside. The fruits are fuzzy red drupes each about a centimeter wide.

Cultivation
The Arctostaphylos morroensis plant is cultivated as a landscaping  ornamental plant, for California native plant, drought tolerant, and natural habitat gardens.

References

External links

Jepson Manual Treatment — Arctostaphylos morroensis
USDA Plants Profile for Arctostaphylos morroensis (Morro manzanita)
Arctostaphylos morroensis — U.C. Photo gallery
Federal Conservation Status & Recovery Plan

morroensis
Endemic flora of California
•
Natural history of the California chaparral and woodlands
Natural history of San Luis Obispo County, California
Garden plants of North America
Drought-tolerant plants